The Canadian Council on Geomatics (CCOG) was created in 1972. It is the major federal-provincial-territorial consultative body for geographic information management. CCOG meets twice a year to discuss programs, developments, legislation, and issues relevant to geomatics. CCOG oversees the GeoBase initiative.

References

External links
Canadian Council on Geomatics

1972 establishments in Canada
Government agencies established in 1972
Scientific organizations based in Canada